This is a timeline of events in the Indonesian Christian Party from its formation in 1945 until the merger in 1973.

Timeline

1945

1946

1947

1950

1951

1952

1954

1955

Bibliography

Main source 
 

Indonesian Christian Party